Pedro Carvalho Cabral (born 29 June 1984 in Lisbon) is a Portuguese rugby union player, who plays as a wing  for Portuguese amateur side Grupo Desportivo Direito, and for Portugal's national side.

Carvalho made his debut for the national side on 20 November 2004, in a match against , and had 28 caps, scoring 25 points. Carvalho was in the Portuguese squad for the 2007 World Cup, where he scored Portugal's first Rugby World Cup try in the opening match against .

References

1984 births
Living people
Portuguese rugby union players
Rugby union wings
Rugby union players from Lisbon
Portugal international rugby union players